Orzu Iso (or Orzu Isoev; born October 14, 1976, Kulab, Kulab region) is a Tajik presenter, TV and radio journalist, songwriter and blogger.

Biography 
Isoev was born on October 14, 1976 in the city of Kulyab and grew up in the city of Kurgan-Tyube. When he was four years old, his parents divorced. In 2013, he graduated from the Faculty of Journalism of the Tajik State Institute of Arts, named after Mirzo Tursunzade.

Works 
Isoev writes poetry according to the aruz system, as well as in the form of free verse. Orzu began to write when he was in high school in the city of Kurgan-Tyube. From a poor family, he did not expect to be able to have a career in poetry and creative arts.

Songs written by Isoev have  been performed by Tajik and Uzbek performers, such as: Sadriddin Najmiddin, Shabnam Surayo, Mehrnigor Rustam, Zulaikho Mahmadshoeva, Nigina Amonqulova, Yulduz Usmonova, Ozoda Nursaidova.

Bibliography 
 Орзу Исо. Дар пардаҳои атласии нури офтоб (шеърҳо), — Душанбе: «Эҷод», 2009. — 52 с. — ISBN 998-99947-39-83-7
 Орзу Исо. ‌Таронаи танҳоӣ (Маҷмӯъаи ашъор), — Душанбе: «Адиб», 2012. — 64 с. — ISBN 998-99947-2-253-2
 Орзу Исо. Он сӯи ёдҳо, — Душанбе: «Эр-граф», 2015. — 220 с. — ISBN 998-99975-46-38-8

References

External links 
 
 

1976 births
Male poets
20th-century Tajikistani poets
Persian-language poets
Tajikistani journalists
Tajik poets
Living people
21st-century Tajikistani poets